Ophiodon ozymandias is an extinct species of lingcod from the Late Miocene of Southern California.

References

Hexagrammidae
Fish of the Pacific Ocean
Miocene fish of North America